Mount Tekarra is a  mountain summit located in the Athabasca River valley of Jasper National Park, in the Canadian Rockies of Alberta, Canada. It is situated at the northwest end of the Maligne Range and is visible from Jasper and the Icefields Parkway. The nearest higher neighbor is The Watchtower,  to the east. 


History

The mountain was named by James Hector in 1859 for Tekarra, an Iroquois guide and hunter who accompanied Hector during his exploration of the Athabasca River during the Palliser Expedition.

The first ascent of Mount Tekarra was made in 1915 by Morrison P. Bridgland (1878-1948), a Dominion Land Surveyor who named many peaks in Jasper Park and the Canadian Rockies. The mountain's name was officially adopted in 1947 by the Geographical Names Board of Canada.

Geology
Mount Tekarra is composed of sedimentary rock laid down during the Cambrian period and pushed east and over the top of younger rock during the Laramide orogeny.

Climate
Based on the Köppen climate classification, Mount Tekarra is located in a subarctic climate zone with long, cold, snowy winters, and mild summers. Winter temperatures can drop below -20 °C with wind chill factors below -30 °C. Precipitation runoff from Mount Tekarra drains into the Maligne River and Tekarra Creek, both tributaries of the Athabasca River.

See also
 Geography of Alberta

References

Gallery

External links
 Parks Canada web site: Jasper National Park
 Mount Tekarra: weather forecast

Canadian Rockies
Two-thousanders of Alberta
Mountains of Jasper National Park
Alberta's Rockies